Valley is a village, community, and former electoral ward near Holyhead on the west coast of Anglesey, North Wales. The population during the 2001 census was 2,413, decreasing to 2,361 at the 2011 census.

Toponym 
The origin of the name has been the subject of much debate for more than a century. Thomas Morgan derived the name as a corruption of "Mael-dy" (house of trade). Morgan links the name with the writings of Tacitus, who stated that trade with Ireland was conducted from here in the time of Julius Agricola.

Gwilym T. Jones and Tomos Roberts state that early accounts name the area as Glan Môr Tŷ Coch and Glan Môr Castell Llyfaint. They offer two further possible derivations of the name Valley; firstly that the name derives from the Irish word Baile (a settlement) and secondly that it developed when the Stanley Embankment (known by locals as 'The Cob') was built in the 1820s and a depression (or valley) was dug to yield rubble for it's construction. The cluster of dwellings nearby was then given the name by these labourers.

In Modern Welsh it is referred to as either Y Dyffryn (meaning The Valley) or [Y] Fali (pronounced as Valley).

Political boundaries 
Prior to the 2012 Anglesey electoral boundary changes Valley was an electoral ward to the Isle of Anglesey County Council. It is now part of the larger Llifon ward, together with Llanfaelog and Llanfair-yn-Neubwll.

The community includes the village of Llanynghenedl and part of Four Mile Bridge.

Transport 

RAF Valley is a nearby Royal Air Force station concerned with the training of fast jet pilots. The runways are also used by Anglesey Airport who make commercial flights to Cardiff (and previously the Isle of Man). Valley railway station is on the North Wales Coast Line and its signal box is Grade II listed. Thomas Telford's A5 road bisects the village.

Sport 
Valley has a football club, the senior team, CPD Y Fali, play in the North Wales Coast West Football League Division One. They play their home matches on Station Road which is situated between the North Wales Coast railway line and the A55 North Wales Expressway.

Notable people 
 Gareth Williams (1978–2010) was a Welsh mathematician and employee of GCHQ seconded to the Secret Intelligence Service (SIS or MI6) who was found dead in suspicious circumstances; he came from Valley.
 George North is a professional rugby union player who plays for the Ospreys in the United Rugby Championship and the Wales national team. He attended Ysgol Gymuned Y Fali. 
 Matt Colin Evans is a director who is known for his award winning short film 'Between the Headphones' and  'A Ray of Hope: HAWFC - The Gym of Champions'. He attended Ysgol Gymuned Y Fali. 
 References

External links 

Valley Community Council
photos of Valley, Anglesey and surrounding area on geograph.org.uk

 
Former wards of Anglesey